KJMT (97.1 FM) is a radio station broadcasting a news talk format. Licensed to Calico Rock, Arkansas, United States, the station serves the areas of Mountain Home, Arkansas and Mountain View, Arkansas, and is currently owned by Monte and Gentry Spearman, through licensee High Plains Radio Network, LLC.

KJMT carries a variety of talk shows such as Rush Limbaugh, Sean Hannity, Glenn Beck, Laura Ingraham, Dave Ramsey, and Rusty Humphries.

References

External links
KJMT's official website

JMT
News and talk radio stations in the United States
Izard County, Arkansas